Sperchopsis is a genus of water scavenger beetles in the family Hydrophilidae. There is one described species in Sperchopsis, S. tessellata.

References

Further reading

 

Hydrophilinae
Articles created by Qbugbot